Tears of Love (Italian: Lacrime d'amore) is a 1954 Italian musical melodrama film directed by Pino Mercanti and starring Achille Togliani, Katina Ranieri and Otello Toso.

Cast
 Achille Togliani as Mario Benetti 
 Katina Ranieri as Grazia Montalto 
 Bianca Maria Fusari as Rosella 
 Otello Toso as Davide Montalto 
 Enrico Glori as Comm. Goebritz 
 Umberto Spadaro as Don Vincenzo Benetti 
 Rita Rosa
 Inelda Meroni
 Dina De Santis
 Nadia Bianchi
 Mimo Billi
 Roberto Paoletti
 John Kitzmiller
 Carlo Romano
 Nada Cortese
 Piero Giagnoni
 Giacomo Furia
 Galeazzo Benti as Dominique 
 Giulio Calì
 Marco Tulli
 Anellina Furia
 Alberto D'Amario
 Renato Lupi
 Edoardo Nevola

References

Bibliography 
 Chiti, Roberto & Poppi, Roberto. Dizionario del cinema italiano: Dal 1945 al 1959. Gremese Editore, 1991.

External links 
 

1954 films
Italian musical drama films
1950s musical drama films
1950s Italian-language films
Films directed by Pino Mercanti
Films set in Naples
Films shot in Naples
1954 drama films
Italian black-and-white films
Melodrama films
1950s Italian films